Judd was an unincorporated community in Webster County, Iowa, United States.

Geography
Judd was in the northern part of Washington Township, adjacent to Colfax Township, 2.5 miles west of Duncombe. Its elevation was 1112 feet (339 m).

History
Judd was named for Norman P. Judd, an executive at the Illinois Central Railroad. In 1913, Judd had a post office/general store. The grain elevator was operated by the Western Elevator Company.

Judd's population was 54 in 1902, and was 52 in 1915.

In 1940, Judd's population was 50.

See also
 Burnside, Iowa

References

Unincorporated communities in Webster County, Iowa
Unincorporated communities in Iowa